Ridgely Johnson (born April 24, 1958) is an American rower. He competed in the men's quadruple sculls event at the 1984 Summer Olympics.

References

External links
 

1958 births
Living people
American male rowers
Olympic rowers of the United States
Rowers at the 1984 Summer Olympics
Sportspeople from New York City